Al-Sayyida al-Mu'iziyya, mainly known as Durzan, was the main consort of Fatimid Caliph al-Muizz and the mother of the Fatimid imam-caliph al-Aziz. She was known as the first patroness of Fatimid architecture. Durzān also founded the second great Fățimid mosque of Cairo, a congregational mosque (no longer extant) located in the Qarafa.

Durzan was born in Mahdia, a Tunisian coastal city, as apparently of Arab-Bedouin origin in 344/955. It is said that, because of her beautiful singing, she was also called Taghrid (Singing As A Bird).
Although many Fatimid sources were destroyed, material evidence and literary sources exist that confirm the vastness of her patronage.

In 976 AD, Durzan inaugurated the first phase through the building of the Jami al-Qarafa Mosque with her daughter, Sitt al-Malik. As Cortese and Calinedri argue, this inauguration of the Jami al-Qarafa Mosque marked the first of the two main phases of Fatimid female architectural patronage. Durzan also sponsored a qasr (palace), a bath, a watering pool and a mausoleum.

Delia Cortese and Simonetta Calderini have noted Fatimid women’s patronage of public monuments and the link between piety – or
religious propaganda – and charity during the delicate early stage of Fatimid rule.

In 963 she moved to the newly established Cairo with the entire court of the Caliph, where later she died in 995 AD/385 H*. It is said that when she died in Cairo in 995 AD, her daughter Sitt al-Malik mourned for a month.

Reference
Sources

Bibliography

Further read
 

Year of birth missing
Year of death missing

Women from the Fatimid Caliphate
10th-century people from the Fatimid Caliphate
People from Mahdia

385 H refers to Hirja, the Islamic calendar year